Macrocheilus is a genus of beetles in the family Carabidae, containing the following species:

 Macrocheilus allardi Basilewsky, 1957
 Macrocheilus alluaudi Burgeon, 1937
 Macrocheilus angustatus Basilewsky, 1949
 Macrocheilus asteriscus (White, 1844)
 Macrocheilus basilewskyi A. Serrano, 2000
 Macrocheilus bensoni Hope, 1838
 Macrocheilus bicolor Andrewes, 1920
 Macrocheilus biguttatus Gory, 1832
 Macrocheilus bimaculatus (Dejean, 1831)
 Macrocheilus binotatus Andrewes, 1931
 Macrocheilus biplagiatus (Boheman, 1848)
 Macrocheilus burgeoni Basilewsky, 1967
 Macrocheilus chaudoiri Andrewes, 1919
 Macrocheilus clasispilus Basilewsky, 1967
 Macrocheilus crampeli Alluaud, 1916
 Macrocheilus cribrarius Fairmaire, 1901
 Macrocheilus cruciatus (Marc, 1840)
 Macrocheilus diplospilus Basilewsky, 1967
 Macrocheilus dorsalis Klug, 1834
 Macrocheilus dorsiger (Chaudoir, 1876)
 Macrocheilus elegantulus Burgeon, 1937
 Macrocheilus ferruginipes Fairmaire, 1892
 Macrocheilus fuscipennis Zhao & Tian, 2010
 Macrocheilus gigas Zhao & Tian, 2010
 Macrocheilus hybridus Peringuey, 1896
 Macrocheilus immanis Andrewes, 1920
 Macrocheilus impictus (Wiedemann, 1823)
 Macrocheilus labrosus (Dejean, 1831)
 Macrocheilus lindemannae Jedlicka, 1963
 Macrocheilus longicollis Peringuey, 1904
 Macrocheilus macromaculatus Louwerens, 1949
 Macrocheilus madagascariensis Basilewsky, 1953
 Macrocheilus moraisi A. Serrano, 2000
 Macrocheilus niger Andrewes, 1920
 Macrocheilus nigrotibialis Heller, 1900
 Macrocheilus ocellatus Basilewsky, 1953
 Macrocheilus overlaeti Burgeon, 1937
 Macrocheilus parvimaculatus Zhao & Tian, 2010
 Macrocheilus perrieri Fairmaire, 1899
 Macrocheilus persimilis Basilewsky, 1970
 Macrocheilus proximus Peringuey, 1896
 Macrocheilus quadratus Zhao & Tian, 2010
 Macrocheilus quadrinotatus Burgeon, 1937
 Macrocheilus saulcyi Chevrolat, 1854
 Macrocheilus scapularis Reiche, 1843
 Macrocheilus sinuatilabris Zhao & Tian, 2010
 Macrocheilus solidipalpis Zhao & Tian, 2010
 Macrocheilus spectandus Peringuey, 1904
 Macrocheilus taedatus Basilewsky, 1960
 Macrocheilus tripustulatus (Dejean, 1825)
 Macrocheilus vanharteni Felix & Muilwijk, 2007
 Macrocheilus varians Peringuey, 1904
 Macrocheilus viduatus Peringuey, 1899
 Macrocheilus vinctus Basilewsky, 1960
 Macrocheilus vitalisi Andrewes, 1920

References

External links
 iNaturalist World Checklist

Anthiinae (beetle)